Rakhee Thakrar (born 29 February 1984) is an English actress. She is known for her roles as Shabnam Masood in the BBC One soap opera EastEnders (2014–2016) and Emily Sands in the Netflix comedy-drama Sex Education (2019–2021). She also voices the Eighth Doctor's companion Bliss in Big Finish's Doctor Who: The Time War audio dramas.

Early life
Thakrar grew up in the city of Leicester, England and is of Indian descent. She attended Soar Valley College. As a teenager, Thakrar became involved with Hathi Productions, a theatre club based in Leicester.

Career

Acting 
In 2004, Thakrar landed the role of Roopa Chauhan in the radio drama Silver Street, which was broadcast on the BBC Asian Network. Thakrar played the role from the first episode in 2004, to the last episode in 2010. In 2006, Thakrar made her first TV appearance in BBC drama Banglatown Banquet. Thakrar went on to feature in a number of TV series including Doctors, Holby City, Peep Show and, notably, played a lead character in the British-Asian drama Cloud 9.

Thakrar was cast in EastEnders in 2013 and made her first on-screen appearance on 13 January 2014. Her character, Shabnam Masood, had previously been played by Zahra Ahmadi from 2007 to 2008. Thakrar's most famous storyline while portraying Shabnam was when the character gave birth to a stillborn son, with viewers, critics and co-workers praising her performance throughout the storyline. Due to her performance in the storyline, Thakrar has subsequently become an ambassador for the stillbirth charity, Sands. Thakrar left EastEnders in 2015 and was last seen onscreen on 5 February 2016, following Shabnam's failed marriage to Kush Kazemi (Davood Ghadami). In 2019, she began portraying the role of Emily Sands in the Netflix series Sex Education.

Journalism 
In 2004, Thakrar was one of 20 young people recruited to the Leicester Mercury's Pathfinder scheme. Run in conjunction with Leicester City Council, it enabled a team of young journalists to spend 10 months gaining an introduction to print journalism and reporting on their communities. During this time Thakrar wrote articles on subjects such as the influence Bollywood has had on Leicester, as well as the peculiar situation of being born on 29 February.

Filmography

Film

Television

Video games

Stage

Awards and nominations

References

External links
 
 

Living people
1984 births
People from Leicester
English people of Indian descent
English soap opera actresses
British radio actresses